Edwin Rich may refer to:

 Edwin Rich (1561–1600), son of the 2nd Baron Rich, knighted on an expedition to Cadiz in 1596
 Edwin Rich (politician) (–1675), English lawyer and MP, his son
 Edwin Rich (historian) (1904–1979), Vere Harmsworth Professor of Imperial and Naval History and Master of St Catharine's College, Cambridge